(also referred to as VC-61 or Fleet Air Squadron 61) is a unit in the Japanese Maritime Self-Defence Force. It is a part of the Fleet Air Force and is based at Naval Air Facility Atsugi in Kanagawa prefecture. It operates LC-90 and Lockheed C-130R Hercules aircraft.

History
The squadron was founded at Atsugi Naval Air Facility on December 20, 1971 equipped with NAMC YS-11 aircraft. In 1989 it began to operate the LC-90, and in November 2014 the unit began to operate five former Lockheed Martin KC-130R tanker aircraft of the US Marine Corps. They were stripped of their refueling equipment and redesigned as C-130R aircraft. In December 2014 the squadron's YS-11s were retired. The former US C-130s came into service from 2014 to 2016.

In the past the squadron has also operated Grumman S-2F-U Tracker, Douglas C-27 Skytrain RFD-6 and Beechcraft B65 Queen Air aircraft.

Aircraft used
 Douglas C-27 Skytrain RFD-6
 Grumman S-2F-U Tracker
 Beechcraft B65 Queen Air
 YS-11M/M-A (1971-2014)
 LC-90 (1989-)
 Lockheed C-130R (2014-)

Gallery

References

Aviation in Japan
Units and formations of the Japan Maritime Self-Defense Force
Military units and formations established in 1971